Jorge Roberto Díaz Price (born 27 July 1998) is a Mexican professional footballer who plays as a midfielder for Liga MX club León.

Career statistics

Club

References

External links
Jorge Diaz at Debut Club Leon

1998 births
Living people
Footballers from Quintana Roo
Association football midfielders
Mexican footballers
Mexican expatriate footballers
Club León footballers
Everton de Viña del Mar footballers
Liga MX players
Chilean Primera División players
Expatriate footballers in Chile